John Carter Racing was a NASCAR Sprint Cup team. It was owned by John Carter. Roger Craven and Dale Davis previously were co-owners of the team.

Career
The team made its debut in 2004 at the Coca-Cola 600, originally as an offshoot of the No. 89 Victory in Jesus racing team and working out of a shop previously occupied by Frank Cicci Racing with Jim Kelly. Todd Bodine was the driver, but the team failed to qualify for the race. After a DNQ the next week at Dover International Speedway, the team made the Pocono 500, but finished 42nd after suffering overheating problems. After finishing 36th at the DHL 400, Bodine left the team, and was replaced by Chad Blount. After failing to qualify for the Pepsi 400, Blount made the field at Chicagoland Speedway, where he finished last after suffering electrical failures. Andy Hillenburg and Stanton Barrett came on to attempt races with the team, but failed. Kevin Lepage took over at the Sharpie 500, and ran the rest of the season with the team, his best finish being 27th at Phoenix International Raceway.

In 2005, the team signed sponsors BOSpoker.net and Patrón Tequila and planned to run the full year. Lepage finished ninth in the Daytona 500 but was released midway through the season. After Anthony Lazzaro ran Watkins Glen, Tony Raines took over the ride, and led two laps at Michigan before running out of fuel in the final laps. Following his release after the UAW-Ford 500, Mike Skinner, Mike Garvey, and Jimmy Spencer shared the ride for the balance of the season.

Blount returned to the No. 37 in 2006 for the Daytona 500, but missed the race. Skinner attempted most of the races with this season, along with Carl Long. In June 2006, a press release said Terance Mathis bought out the operation and renamed it Victory Motorsports, however only Dale Davis joined the ownership of the team. Skinner piloted the car at Indianapolis, and Bill Elliott started 39th and finished 16th at Kansas Speedway, the team's best showing to date. He ran an additional two races for the team, but did not finish higher 31st.

The team ran the 2007 season after partnering with the Front Row Motorsports No. 61 team. Elliott attempted the 2007 Daytona 500 with the team, but failed to qualify and the Past Champion's Provisional went to Dale Jarrett, who was the more recent former series champion not in the Top 35. John Andretti successfully made the race the next week at California Speedway and finished 34th. The deal with Front Row Motorsports fell through, and the two teams are no longer associated, with Front Row Motorsports retaining the No. 37. The team was renamed to E&M Motorsports and made its debut with Joe Nemechek, who had been released from Ginn Racing following its merger with Dale Earnhardt Inc. When Nemechek found a ride with Furniture Row Racing, E&M called upon Burney Lamar, but he DNQ'd all of his attempted races.

It was announced on January 12, 2008 that Carl Long would pilot the teams No. 08 Dodge at the Daytona 500, but he unfortunately failed to qualify. The team would acquire limited sponsorship from an affiliate of German-based Rhino's Energy Drink. Burney Lamar would fail to qualify the Rhino's Dodge at Fontana, Atlanta and Texas.  Tony Raines  was unsuccessful in his attempts at Martinsville, Bristol and Charlotte. John Carter Racing entered into a relationship with FUBAR hydration drink during May 2008. Tony Raines would finish 23rd in the Sprint Showdown at Charlotte after experiencing mechanical issues.  Johnny Sauter joined the team and made the Pepsi 500 Race at Auto Club Speedway finishing 42nd. This was the team's first and only race to date that the team has qualified for.

For the 2009 NASCAR season, E&M Motorports signed James Hylton for the Daytona 500, and potentially more races later in the year.
E&M Motorsports and Simo Racing (formerly No Fear Racing) announced that the teams would form an alliance for the Daytona 500. The alliance, to be referred to as Carter/Simo Racing, saw Hylton and Boris Said temporarily change numbers. Simo's team fielded the No. 08 Ford for Said under E&M's ownership and E&M fielded the No. 60 Dodge for Hylton under Simo's ownership. The No. 60 team had carburetor issues and was not able to run a lap at mandated practice speed, which under NASCAR rules prevented them from attempting to qualify. The No. 08 with Boris Said wrecked in his Gatorade Duel Race.

In June 2009, Carter and Said announced they would again partner. The pair brought the No. 08 Ford to Infineon raceway attempting to qualify for the Toyota Save Mart 350. Said qualified the car, 9th and finished 24th. Although originally unsponsored the team secured a sponsorship through California Outdoor Heritage Alliance.

On July 10, 2009, the team announced they had signed Terry Labonte and he would share driving duties with Boris Said. Despite still seeking a full-time sponsor, the team planned to run the remainder of the 2009 season starting July 26 at Indianapolis. On July 24, 2009, Carter Simo Racing announced it was purchasing the assets of the defunct Mayfield Motorsports team. With the purchase the team temporarily switched from Ford to Toyota, which Mayfield Motorsports was running. However, for the Heluva Good! Sour Cream Dips at The Glen in August the team returned Said to the car and switched manufacturers back to Ford. Labonte would be entered in the majority of the remaining races the team attempted, with the exception of the 2009 Dickies 500, where Derrike Cope was entered. The team withdrew before practice.

On February 3, 2010, it was announced that John Carter Racing, due to not finding sponsorship for the race team, would be auctioning off all the equipment, parts and haulers, and all three cars on February 16, 2010 by the auction company Iron Horse Auction.

Car No. 08/37 results

External links 
Official Website
John Carter Sprint Cup Stats
Jayski Team Page
Iron Horse Auction

2004 establishments in Georgia (U.S. state)
American auto racing teams
Companies based in Stephens County, Georgia
Defunct NASCAR teams
Auto racing teams established in 2004
Auto racing teams disestablished in 2010